Babulal Sah Kanu is a Nepalese politician who is member of Provincial Assembly of Madhesh Province. Kanu, a resident of Gaur was elected to the 2017 provincial assembly election from Rautahat 1(A).

Electoral history

2017 Nepalese provincial elections

References

Living people
Members of the Provincial Assembly of Madhesh Province
Madhesi people
People from Rautahat District
Loktantrik Samajwadi Party, Nepal politicians
Year of birth missing (living people)